Pablo Andrés Mieres Gómez (born 30 July 1959 in Montevideo) is a Uruguayan lawyer, sociologist, professor and politician of the Independent Party  (PI), serving as Minister of Labour and Social Welfare of Uruguay, since March 1, 2020.

Political career 
He was elected to the Uruguayan Parliament in 1999, serving during the 2000–2005 term as a representative for Montevideo. Since 2003 he leads the centre-left Independent Party. 

He was a presidential candidate in the 2004 and 2009 general elections, opportunities in which he was also a senatorial candidate, a position to which he was not elected.

2014 
In the national elections of 2014 he was a candidate for the Presidency and the Senate, reaching this time, a seat in the Upper House. His party obtained 3.2% of the votes and reached three seats in the Chamber of Deputies (Iván Posada, Daniel Radío and Heriberto Sosa).

In the 2014 general elections, once again he ran for the Presidency and the Senate, finally getting access to a seat in the Upper House.

2019 
For the 2019 primary elections, Mieres created La Alternativa, a new political space, made up of politicians from other parties: Esteban Valenti and his wife Selva Andreoli (Broad Front), Fernando Amado (Colorado Party), Victor Lissidini (Party Intransigent) and Luis Franzini Batlle (Colorado Party).  However, this alliance was short lived. After announcing that Andreoli was the candidate for Vice President, she herself made controversial statements. Mieres left the alliance. 

Mieres did not achieve reelection in the Senate for the period 2020–2025; but he supported Luis Alberto Lacalle Pou in the second round against Daniel Martínez Villamil. Looking at the conformation of Lacalle Pou's cabinet, Mieres agreed to head the Ministry of Labour and Social Welfare.

References

External links

1959 births
Living people
People from Montevideo
University of the Republic (Uruguay) alumni
20th-century Uruguayan lawyers
Uruguayan sociologists
Uruguayan politicians
Candidates for President of Uruguay
Uruguayan vice-presidential candidates